François Audrain is a French pop singer. He also taught history at Collège François Truffaut (in Betton) until 2006 and later at Collège Émile Zola (in Rennes)

Discography

Studio albums 
2001: Détachée (Tôt Ou Tard/Warner Music France)
2004: Chambres Lointaines (Tôt Ou Tard/Warner Music France)
2009: Les Soirs d'Eté (Tôt Ou Tard/Warner Music France)

External links 
 a page on François Audrain from Tôt Ou Tard, his current label (in French)
 a page on Tôt Ou Tard (in English)

References

Year of birth missing (living people)
Living people
French male singers
French singer-songwriters
French male singer-songwriters